Roy Powell may refer to:
 Roy Powell (musician) (born 1965), British jazz pianist
 Roy Powell (rugby league, born 1965) (1965–1998), English rugby league player
 Roy Powell (New Zealand rugby league) (fl. 1930s), New Zealand rugby league player